Jordan Evangelical Theological Seminary (JETS) is a theological seminary in Amman, Jordan. It was founded in 1991 by Imad Shehadeh, who continues to serve as President. It is accredited by the Asia Theological Association, and offers Bachelor of Theology, Master of Arts in Biblical Studies, Master of Divinity, and Master of Theology degrees.

References

External links
 

Evangelical seminaries and theological colleges
Educational institutions established in 1991
Universities and colleges in Jordan
Education in Amman
1991 establishments in Jordan